Mytton is a hamlet in Shropshire, England.

It is situated in the parish of Pimhill, near to the small village of Fitz.

Jonnie Woodall (1946-2009), Olympian bobsledder and luger, lived in Mytton at the time of his death.

References

External links

Hamlets in Shropshire